Overeem is a surname. Notable people with the surname include:

Alistair Overeem (born 1980), Dutch mixed martial artist and kickboxer, brother of Valentijn
Casper van Overeem (1893–1927), Dutch mycologist
Joris van Overeem (born 1994), Dutch footballer
Valentijn Overeem (born 1976), Dutch mixed martial artist and kickboxer